No 151 Wing Royal Air Force was a British unit which operated with the Soviet forces on the Kola Peninsula in the northern USSR during the first months of Operation Barbarossa, in the Second World War. Operation Benedict, the 1941 expedition to Murmansk, provided air defence for Allied ships as they were discharging at ports within range of  units in Norway and Finland.

The British party converted Soviet air and ground crews to British Hawker Hurricane IIB fighters and their Rolls-Royce Merlin engines, many of which were due to be delivered under British Lend-Lease arrangements.

In the five weeks of the operation, 151 Wing claimed 16 victories, four probables and seven aircraft damaged. Conversion of Soviet Air Forces pilots and ground crew to Hurricanes began in mid-October. At the end of November the RAF party returned to Britain, less some signals staff; the wing was then disbanded.

On 10 March 1944, 151 Wing was reformed in Iraq with transport aircraft, then disbanded again on 1 June 1946. From 1 October 1959 to 9 September 1964, 151 Wing was an air defence missile unit and was then disbanded for the last time.

Background

Within days of the German invasion of the Soviet Union (Operation Barbarossa), Britain and the USSR entered into a formal military alliance. Anxious to offer immediate support to their new ally, British submarines, minelayers and aircraft carriers quickly put in an appearance off the north coast of Finland. On 31 July 1941, carrier-borne aircraft from  conducted the Raid on Kirkenes and Petsamo. The British lost three aircraft and inflicted only minor damage on a small freighter and harbour facilities. The Royal Navy then mined the approaches to Petsamo.

Prelude

The Dervish convoy assembled at Reykjavik in Iceland, consisting of six merchant ships Lancastrian Prince, New Westminster City, Esneh, Trehata, the elderly Llanstephan Castle loaded with raw materials and 15 crated Hawker Hurricane fighter aircraft, the fleet oiler  and the Dutch freighter Alchiba. Strength delivered the personnel of No. 151 Wing RAF Royal Air Force to Russia and the 24 Hurricanes were flown off Argus to Vaenga (later renamed Severomorsk) airfield, near Murmansk. Due to the lack of Luftwaffe aerial reconnaissance aircraft in the region, the ships arrived safely.

Operation Benedict

On 12 July 1941, a Soviet commission met representatives of the Royal Navy and the RAF in London and it was decided to use the Vaenga-1 airfield to defend Allied ships while unloading at the ports of Murmansk, Arkhangelsk and Polyarnoe. No. 151 Wing RAF (Neville Ramsbottom-Isherwood) was established, comprising 81 Squadron and 134 Squadron, equipped with Hawker Hurricanes. The pilots had come from 81 Squadron, 504 Squadron or had just completed their training. The wing was to be transported to north Russia in Operation Dervish, the first Arctic convoy, to operate until the weather in October or November grounded the aircraft. During the winter lull, the fighters were to be handed over to the Soviet Air Forces (VVS, Voyenno-Vozdushnye Sily).

The majority of the airmen embarked on the steamship SS Llanstephan Castle together with 15 Hurricanes packed in crates, at the Scapa Flow anchorage in the Orkney Islands. The remaining 24 aircraft went on board the aircraft carrier Argus as part of Operation Strength, in which the carrier, a cruiser and three destroyers, carried the RAF party. No facilities existed for the assembly of the crated Hurricanes; improvisation and the co-operation of the local Russians overcame the lack of specialist equipment, such as airscrew spanners and the job took nine days. The aircraft were flown to Vaenga on 12 September, except for two Hurricanes, whose pilots succumbed to Russian hospitality at a refuelling stop and had to continue the morning after.

Vaenga airfield had an adequate surface of compacted sand which became very bumpy in wet weather. Airfield facilities were linked by a tarmac road but beyond the perimeter, there were only cart tracks. Accommodation was in brick buildings but wooden huts were found to be unkempt. Bedding was new, the food was ample, though some considered to be a little greasy and the sanitation was hideous, leading to the British naming the main latrine, directly over a cesspit, "The Kremlin". Co-operation from the Russians was excellent and Isherwood established rapport with the Soviet commanding general and gained the agreement of the Russians on bomber escort tactics.

Within 24 hours of commencing operations, the wing shot down its first German aircraft. On 12 September, five Hurricanes of 81 Squadron intercepted a Henschel reconnaissance aircraft and five Messerschmitt Bf 109 escorts from Petsamo. The Hurricanes carried only six of their battery of eight machine-guns but shot down three Bf 109s and damaged the Henschel for a loss of one aircraft and pilot. In its five weeks of operations, the wing claimed 16 victories, four probables and seven aircraft damaged. The winter snows began on 22 September and the conversion of VVS pilots and ground crew to Hurricanes began in mid-October. In late November the RAF party returned, less various signals staff. During a scramble, the pilot of a 134 Squadron Hurricane taxied with two airmen sitting on the tail to counter the bumpy surface. The pilot took off unaware that the airmen were still there and crashed soon after, the pilot being seriously injured and the airmen killed.

Aftermath

Analysis

151 Wing "carried out 365 sorties during its stay at Vaenga, claiming 11 Messerschmitt fighters and three Ju 88 bombers shot down" The main objectives of the 1941 expedition to Murmansk, to show the quality of the Hurricane aircraft when properly handled and to train Soviet pilots and their ground crews on the British military equipment, that would soon be supplied to the Soviet Union. The operation was judged to have fulfilled these objectives. Only 81 Squadron received the battle honour 'Russia, 1941'. The Soviet Union recognised the contribution of No. 151 Wing, by the awards of the Order of Lenin to Wing Commander Ramsbottom-Isherwood, Squadron Leaders A. H. Rook and A. G. Miller and Flight Sergeant Haw. In 1944, the Engineering Officer in charge of assembling the Hurricanes, Flight Lieutenant Gittins, was awarded the Order of the Red Star.

Subsequent operations

On 5 July 1942, No. 153 Wing RAF was raised in England with the intention of resuming RAF operations on the front. This was a force of four squadrons of Supermarine Spitfires and two squadrons of ground-attack Hurricanes. This would have involved around  personnel. Possibly due to increased convoy casualties, the operation was called off and 153 Wing was stood down.

Operation Orator

On 2 September 1942, two Bomber Command units, 144 Squadron and 455 Squadron, Royal Australian Air Force, flew 32 Handley Page Hampdens from Britain to Murmansk. The Hampdens had been refurbished as torpedo-bombers and Operation Orator was designed to cover Convoy PQ 18. The Admiralty did not want a repeat of the tragedy that befell Convoy PQ 17, destroyed by the U-boats and Luftwaffe. The British wanted to protect the convoy from the German surface fleet, especially the battleship . Nine Hampdens were lost en route, due mainly to harsh Arctic weather, compass failures, German fighters and anti-aircraft fire. The squadrons operated briefly from Vaenga air base, before handing their Hampdens over to the Soviet Air Force. Commonwealth aircrew under RAF command remained active in the Murmansk area until 1944, operating Catalina, Lockheed Hudson and photoreconnaissance Spitfire aircraft from Vaenga and Lakhta, supporting Arctic convoys with maritime patrol and escort flying.

151 Wing redux
No. 151 Wing was reformed on 10 March 1944 as a transport wing headquartered at RAF Habbaniya in Iraq, and operated until its disbanding on 1 June 1946. From 1 October 1959 to 9 September 1964, 151 Wing was an air defence missile unit based at RAF North Luffenham, controlling 62 Squadron at RAF Woolfox Lodge and 257 Squadron at RAF Warboys, equipped with Bristol Bloodhound surface-to-air missiles.

See also
 Normandie-Niemen, another Western air squadron operating on the Eastern Front.
 List of Wings of the Royal Air Force

References

Citations

Bibliography
Books

 
 
 
 

Websites

Further reading

External links
 Hawker Hurricane IIB 'Trop' Z5252
 Wings 111–192 at Air of Authority – A History of RAF Organisation

Continuation War
Finland–Soviet Union relations
Wings of the Royal Air Force in the Second World War
Royal Air Force wings
Soviet Union–United Kingdom relations
Military units and formations disestablished in 1964
Air defence units and formations